Handmann is a surname. Notable people with the surname include:

 Jakob Emanuel Handmann (1718–1781), Swiss painter
 Rudolf Handmann (1862–1940), Swiss pastor, professor, theologian, and biblical scholar

German-language surnames